Copper Center Airport , also known as Copper Center 2 Airport, is a state-owned public-use airport located one nautical mile (2 km) south of the central business district of Copper Center, in the Copper River Census Area of the U.S. state of Alaska, United States.

Facilities and aircraft
Copper Center Airport has one runway designated 13/31 with a gravel surface measuring 2,200 by 55 feet (671 x 17 m).

For the 12-month period ending December 31, 2005, the airport had 1,200 aircraft operations, an average of 100 per month: 92% general aviation and 8% air taxi. At that time there were seven aircraft based at this airport, all single-engine.

References

External links
 FAA Alaska airport diagram (GIF)
 Topographic map as of 1 July 1949 from USGS The National Map

Airports in Copper River Census Area, Alaska